The 2007 South Australian National Football League season was the 128th season of the top-level Australian rules football competition in South Australia.

Ladder

Grand final

References 

SANFL
South Australian National Football League seasons